Rociada is a settled area in San Miguel County, New Mexico, United States, located 27 miles northwest of Las Vegas, the county seat. One of the valleys of the Sangre de Cristo Mountains, with the Manuelitas Creek running through it, Rociada actually comprises two villages, Upper and Lower Rociada. Several nearby villages such as Pendaries and Gascon, although technically in Mora County also use the Rociada postal address. Rociada's name means "sprinkled with dew" in Spanish, reflecting its relatively mild, moist climate in the summer compared to the other hot and arid areas of Northern New Mexico.

Notable people
Milnor Rudulph (1826-1887) died in Rociada where he lived in his later years and taught in the village school. He had been Speaker of the New Mexico Territory Legislature to which was elected in 1870 and led the inquest into the death of Billy the Kid in 1881.
Nepomuceno Segura (1855–?) lived in Rociada for part of his life. He was one of the delegates to the New Mexico Constitutional Convention of 1910 and had been the translator of the first statute laws of Colorado in 1876.
José A. Baca (1876–1924), the 5th Lieutenant Governor of New Mexico and his wife Marguerite Pendaries Baca (1876–1971), the 6th Secretary of State of New Mexico had a large ranch in Rociada. Their daughter, Emilie, who grew up on the ranch, later married Patrick Tracy Lowell Putnam (1904-1953), an American anthropologist who spent twenty-five years living among the Mbuti pygmies in central Africa. Another daughter, Consuelo, was the second wife of writer and anthropologist Oliver La Farge.
Antonia Apodaca (1923–2020), a musician and songwriter known for her performances of the traditional Hispano folk music of New Mexico, was born and raised in Rociada.

References

Unincorporated communities in San Miguel County, New Mexico
Unincorporated communities in New Mexico